Henry Wise Wood, CMG (May 31, 1860 – June 10, 1941) was an American-born Canadian agrarian thinker and activist. He became director in 1914 and was elected president of the United Farmers of Alberta in 1916. Under his leadership the UFA became the most powerful political lobby group in the province. In 1919, Wood oversaw the transition of the UFA into a political party and in 1921 they formed the government of Alberta, winning 38 of 61 seats in the Legislative Assembly. Wood refused to enter electoral politics himself but led the UFA's extra-parliamentary organization throughout, and influenced the elected government from the sidelines.

Background and early career
Wood was born on a farm near Monroe City, Missouri to a prosperous farming family with land holding in Missouri and Texas. He became an accomplished stockman while still a teenager. At the age of 44 he visited Alberta and the following year (1905) purchased a wheat farm and moved his family to Carstairs, Alberta.

Leadership of United Farmers of Alberta

An earnest student of agrarian reform, he had observed the Alliance and Populist movements in Missouri during the 1890s and after relocating to Canada soon joined the Society for Equity, an early farm association. In 1909 the Society for Equity merged with the Alberta Farmers' Association to form the United Farmers of Alberta. In 1914 Wood became a director of the UFA; in 1915 he was elected vice-president and was president from 1916 to 1931.

Class conflict ideology

Wood became well known as the main theorist and head of the radical Albertan branch of the wave of agrarian discontent that was sweeping Canada at the time. He consistently refused to run for office. After initial opposition due to past experience with will-fated political farm organizations in the U.S., he backed the United Farmers when they began to engage in direct politics - running for office - and also supported the Progressive Party of Canada and UFA candidates federally. Wood's basic ideology was one of supporting farmers' class interests against bankers and industrialists and hope for birth of co=operative society. He put forward new idea of representative government  - the concept of "group government" - in which a legislature proportionally representing each sector of the society would replace the existing parliamentary system where political parties represent narrow class interests.

Later life

Appointed a Companion of the Order of St Michael and St George in 1935, Wood continued to play an important role in the UFA until 1937 when he retired to his farm in Carstairs, Alberta.

He died in 1941. A school in Calgary, Henry Wise Wood Senior High, was named after him.

References

Works cited

External links
 

1860 births
1941 deaths
Canadian cooperative organizers
United Farmers of Alberta politicians
American expatriates in Canada
Persons of National Historic Significance (Canada)
Canadian agrarianists
People from Carstairs, Alberta
People from Monroe City, Missouri
Canadian Companions of the Order of St Michael and St George